Tidewater is an unincorporated community in Lincoln County, Oregon, United States located on the Alsea River east of Waldport on Oregon Route 34.

Tidewater was named because it is near the head of the tide of the Alsea River. Tidewater post office was established in 1878.

Tidewater is the home of White Wolf Sanctuary, a rescue facility for Arctic wolves.

Climate
This region experiences warm (but not hot) and dry summers, with no average monthly high temperatures in Tidewater above . According to the Köppen Climate Classification system, Tidewater has a warm-summer Mediterranean climate, abbreviated "Csb" on climate maps.

References

External links
Images of the former Tidewater Covered Bridge from Salem Public Library

Unincorporated communities in Lincoln County, Oregon
Alsea River
1878 establishments in Oregon
Populated places established in 1878
Unincorporated communities in Oregon